Major Figgas was an American hip hop group from Philadelphia, Pennsylvania.

History
Major Figgas was founded in the Erie Ave area of Philadelphia by Gillie da Kid, Wallo, and Abliva, who were friends from the neighborhood. They knew Bump J, Dutch and Rolx from all living in the same area, and eventually expanded after inducting Spade and Bianca. Chops, Rucie, L deniro and Dirty Rik all soon came aboard.

After releasing several underground tapes, they released the full-length Figgas 4 Life independently which landed them a deal with RuffNation Records/Warner Bros. Records. An expanded edition of the album was issued in 2000, which reached number 115 on the U.S.Billboard 200 and number 29 on the R&B/Hip-Hop Albums chart. Their lone major radio hit was "Yeah That's Us", which reached number 2 on the Rap Singles chart and number 34 on the R&B Singles chart.

Discography

References

American hip hop groups
Musical groups from Philadelphia
Rappers from Philadelphia
Gangsta rap groups